Herbert Hriberschek Ágústsson (8 August 1926 – 20 June 2017) was an Austrian-Icelandic composer and hornist.
 
Ágústsson was born in Austria in August 1926. After completing his studies in 1944 in Graz with Franz Mixa and Arthur Michl, he played first horn for the Graz Philharmonic Orchestra for seven years. In 1953, he moved to Iceland, where he became principal hornist in the Iceland Symphony Orchestra.

His best known works include the Conc. Breve, op. 19 (1970) and Athvarf (1974). For his own instrument, he composed the Concerto for Horn and Orchestra (1963). He died in June 2017 at the age of 90 in Ísafold.

References 

 Biography from Nordic Music Days

1926 births
2017 deaths
20th-century classical composers
Austrian classical composers
Austrian horn players
Austrian male classical composers
Austrian emigrants to Iceland
Classical horn players
Herbert Agustsson
Herbert Agustsson
20th-century male musicians